Tennessee's 10th congressional district was a district of the United States Congress in Tennessee. It was lost to redistricting in 1953. Its last Representative was Clifford Davis.

List of representatives

Election results

1920

1922

1924

References

 Congressional Biographical Directory of the United States 1774–present

Former congressional districts of the United States
10
1833 establishments in Tennessee
1953 disestablishments in Tennessee